Sigfrid Jacobsson (4 June 1883 – 20 July 1961) was a Swedish long-distance runner. He competed in the marathon at the 1912 Summer Olympics and finished sixth.

References

External links
 

1883 births
1961 deaths
Athletes from Helsinki
People from Uusimaa Province (Grand Duchy of Finland)
Swedish-speaking Finns
Athletes (track and field) at the 1912 Summer Olympics
Swedish male long-distance runners
Swedish male marathon runners
Olympic athletes of Sweden